George Whitcomb may refer to:

 George Faunce Whitcomb (1893–1969), American poet
 George Dexter Whitcomb (1834–1914), American manufacturer and founder of the town of Glendora, California
 George Whitcomb (1803–1881), early colonist in Tasmania, sometime manager of a factory at Smelting Works Bay

See also
George Whitcombe, Welsh footballer